Felipe Felicio Silva Reis (born 6 November 2002) is a Brazilian professional footballer who plays as a forward for Meistriliiga club FCI Levadia, on loan from Campeonato Brasileiro Série A side Atlético Mineiro.

Club career
Born in Belo Horizonte, Felicio began his career at Atlético Mineiro and made his professional debut for the club on 28 February 2021 in a Campeonato Mineiro match against URT; he came on as a 67th minute substitute for Diego Tardelli as Atlético won 3–0.

In December 2022, Felicio reached an agreement to join Estonian club FCI Levadia on loan for the 2023 Meistriliiga season.

Career statistics

Club

Honours
Atlético Mineiro
Campeonato Brasileiro Série A: 2021
Copa do Brasil: 2021
Campeonato Mineiro: 2021, 2022
Supercopa do Brasil: 2022

References

External links
Profile at the ZeroZero website

2002 births
Living people
Footballers from Belo Horizonte
Brazilian footballers
Association football forwards
Clube Atlético Mineiro players
FCI Levadia Tallinn players

Brazil youth international footballers
Brazilian expatriate footballers
Brazilian expatriate sportspeople in Estonia
Expatriate footballers in Estonia